The Mysterious Island (literally "Calypso's Island"), sometimes advertised with the subtitle Ulysse et le géant Polyphème ("Odysseus and the Giant Polyphemus"), is a 1905 French short silent film by Georges Méliès. It was sold by Méliès's Star Film Company and is numbered 750–752 in its catalogues. The film is four minutes long.

Méliès plays Odysseus in the film, which is based on two completely separate scenes from the Odyssey, combining Ogygia, Calypso's island in the Ionian Sea, with Polyphemus's cave near Mount Etna in Sicily. The film's special effects are worked with stage machinery, multiple exposures, substitution splices, and dissolves. Polyphemus's eye is puppeteered with two strings, while the giant arm is probably Méliès's own.

References

External links
 

French black-and-white films
Films directed by Georges Méliès
French silent short films
Films based on classical mythology
Films based on the Odyssey
Films set in the Mediterranean Sea
Greek and Roman deities in fiction
Films set in ancient Greece